Paul Daniel Longolius (1 November 1704 – 24 February 1779) was the main editor of volumes 3 to 18 of Johann Heinrich Zedler's Grosses vollständiges Universal-Lexicon (an early encyclopedia) from 1733 to 1739, replacing Jacob August Franckenstein, who had edited the first two volumes. His successor was Carl Günther Ludovici.

He was born in Dresden and died in Hof.

References

1704 births
1779 deaths
German encyclopedists
People from the Electorate of Saxony
German male non-fiction writers